Pachypus is a genus of dung beetle in the family Scarabaeidae.

Species
 Pachypus caesus Erichson, 1840 
 Pachypus candidae (Petagna, 1786)

References 

Melolonthinae